is a Japanese footballer currently playing as a goalkeeper for Fujieda MYFC.

Club career
Uchiyama started his career with Kawasaki Frontale before enrolling at the Tokai University. Following his graduation, he signed to Japan Football League side Tokyo Musashino City. Having only made one appearance for the Tokyo-based side, he signed for J-League side Roasso Kumamoto. His career with Roasso did not kick off immediately, and he had to wait three years before making his debut in J3 League on 27 June 2020, playing the entirety of a 3-2 win against Kagoshima United.

Career statistics

Club
.

Notes

References

External links

1993 births
Living people
People from Kamakura
Sportspeople from Kanagawa Prefecture
Association football people from Kanagawa Prefecture
Tokai University alumni
Japanese footballers
Association football goalkeepers
Japan Football League players
J3 League players
Tokyo Musashino United FC players
Roasso Kumamoto players
Fujieda MYFC players